The human gene API5 encodes the protein Apoptosis inhibitor 5.

This gene encodes an apoptosis inhibitory protein whose expression prevents apoptosis after growth factor deprivation. This protein suppresses the transcription factor E2F1-induced apoptosis and also interacts with, and negatively regulates acinus, a nuclear factor involved in apoptotic DNA fragmentation. Its depletion enhances the cytotoxic action of chemotherapeutic drugs. Crystal structure of API5 exhibited the function for protein-protein interaction 

Diseases associated with API5 include colon adenocarcinoma, and cervical cancer.

API5 functions in nuclear export of mRNA.

References

Further reading